The 2021 North Miami mayoral election took place on May 11, 2021, to elect the mayor of North Miami, Florida. The election was officially nonpartisan, although all the candidates were Democrats. Philippe Bien-Aime won 63.86% of the vote and won the election against Micheal Etienne.

Candidates
Philippe Bien-Aime - Incumbent Mayor since 2019. (Democratic Party)
Micheal Etienne - Former city clerk. (Democratic Party)

Results

References

2021
2021 United States mayoral elections
2021 Florida elections
May 2021 events in the United States